The Malabar tree toad (Pedostibes tuberculosus), or warty Asian tree toad, is a species of toad found in forests along the Western Ghats of great Karnataka or Deccan. It is a small species and is found in wet tree hollows or leaf bases containing water. It is the only species in the monotypic genus Pedostibes, also known as Asian tree toads.

Taxonomy
Formerly, the genus Pedostibes also hosted other Southeast Asian species that were subsequently moved to a new genus, Rentapia, in 2016.

Description

This is a slender frog with a moderate-sized head. The snout is pointed and the lores are vertical. The distance between the eyes is as wide as the upper eyelid width. The ear opening (tympanum) is well marked and is about a third of the diameter of the eye. The fingers are moderate, depressed, and webbed at the base. The first finger is half the length of the second. The toes are almost entirely webbed and the tips of both fingers and toes are dilated into broad, truncated disks being smaller on the toes. The tubercle near the joint is small, with two small, flat metatarsal tubercles. There is no tarsal fold. When the hind limb is held straight beside the body, the metatarsal tubercles reach to between the eye and tip of the snout. Skin of upper parts is rough (tubercular), the largest tubercles being arranged along each side of the back. In color, it is brownish-grey above, with the sides darker; a white band runs from below the eye to the axil; another white, longitudinal band is in the lumbar region; the beneath is dark-spotted. The male has a subgular vocal sac. Females are larger than males. Adults of this toad grow to 3.6-3.85 cm in length.

The call is described as a "shirrrr shirr shirr shirr", with a dominant frequency of 3780 Hz, each call lasting 3 to 7 sec with three to 10 pulses.

Its length from snout to vent is 1.4 in.

Habitat
This species is known to live in tree habitats, but adults are found among leaf litter, climbing into trees at night.  They are found in the forest of the Western Ghats at elevations of 250 m to over 1000 m, often beside streams.

References

External links

Frogs of India
Endemic fauna of the Western Ghats
Pedostibes
Amphibians described in 1876
Amphibians of Asia
Taxa named by Albert Günther